Yamaha entered the ATC market in 1980, after paying patent-right to Honda to produce their own version of the All Terrain Cycle. Starting Modestly with a 125cc Recreation ATC that would remain the foundation of their line through 1985, the YT125 featured a 2 Stoke engine with sealed airbox with snorkel intake, an autolube oil injection system, and featured a narrow tunnel above the engine that was advertised to make the machine easier to keep stable in precarious situations. Advertising pointed out the durability of the tires, at a time when Honda ATC's were still known for relatively weak low-pressure ballon tires.

Yamaha followed the YT125 with the introduction of the YT175 in 1982

References

Yamaha ATVs